Bhim Sain Bassi or more commonly B.S. Bassi (born 20 February 1956) is an Indian Police Service (IPS) officer and has served as a member of the Union Public Service Commission since 31 May 2016 to February 2021. He served as the Commissioner of Police, Delhi from August 2013 to February 2016. He previously served as the Special Commissioner of Police (Administration) of Delhi Police (2012–13), Special Commissioner of Police (Traffic) of Delhi Police (2011-2012), Director General of Police of Goa Police (2009-2011) and Inspector General of Police of Chandigarh Police (2000-2002).

Bassi, a 1977 batch Indian Police Service officer, began his police career as an assistant superintendent of police in Pondicherry. Since then he has served in various capacities in Delhi and other parts of the India, including Arunachal Pradesh, Chandigarh and Goa.

Early life and education
Bassi was born on 20 February 1956. He completed his graduation in commerce from Shri Ram College of Commerce of University of Delhi. Which is followed by a degree in law studies.

Police career

 Pondicherry
 Delhi (first tenure)
 Arunachal Pradesh
 Chandigarh
 Delhi (second tenure)
 Goa
 Delhi (third tenure)

Personal life
Bassi married to Sunira Bassi, who is also a bureaucrat posted with the Northern Railway as the Chief Traffic Planning Manager. The couple have a daughter and a son.

References

External links
 Delhi Police official website

1956 births
Living people
Delhi University alumni
Commissioners of Delhi Police
Chiefs of police
Indian police officers
People from Delhi
Members of Union Public Service Commission